Elections are held in Lubbock, Texas to elect the city's mayor. Currently, such elections are regularly scheduled to elect mayors to two-year terms.

Elections before 2006

2006

The 2006 Lubbock mayoral election was held on May 13, 2006, to elect the mayor of Lubbock, Texas. It saw the election of David Miller as the 32nd mayor of Lubbock.

2008

The 2008 Lubbock mayoral election was held on May 10, 2008, to elect the mayor of Lubbock, Texas. It saw the election of Tom Martin as the 33rd mayor of Lubbock defeating the one term incumbent mayor David Miller.

2010

The 2010 Lubbock mayoral election was held on May 8, 2010, to elect the mayor of Lubbock, Texas. It saw the reelection of Tom Martin.

2012

The 2012 Lubbock mayoral election was held on May 12, 2012, to elect the mayor of Lubbock, Texas. It saw the election of Glen Robertson, who unseated incumbent mayor Tom Martin.

2014

The 2014 Lubbock mayoral election was held on May 10, 2014, to elect the mayor of Lubbock, Texas. Incumbent mayor Glen Robertson was reelected, running unopposed.

2016

The 2016 Lubbock mayoral election was held on May 7, 2016, to elect the mayor of Lubbock, Texas. It saw the election of Dan Pope as Lubbock's 35th mayor.

2018

The 2018 Lubbock mayoral election was held on May 5, 2018, to elect the mayor of Lubbock, Texas. It saw the re-election of Dan Pope.

2020

The 2020 Lubbock mayoral election took place on November 3, 2020. The election saw Dan Pope reelected to serve a third  consecutive term as mayor.

The election was originally scheduled to take place on May 2, 2020, however was postponed to November 3 after a proclamation from Texas governor Greg Abbott to allow political subdivisions to delay voting. The delay was due to concerns related to the COVID-19 pandemic.

2022

The 2022 Lubbock mayoral election took place on May 7, 2022. The incumbent Mayor, Dan Pope, did not stand for reelection.  Tray Payne was voted to serve as Lubbock's 36th mayor.

References 

 
Non-partisan elections